Iljimae is a 1993 South Korean mini series based on the novel with the same title by Choi Jung-joo starring Jang Dong-gun and Yum Jung-ah. It aired on MBC from August 9 to August 31, 1993, every Mondays and Tuesdays at 21:50 until 22:50 for 8 episodes.

Cast
Jang Dong-gun as Iljimae (일지매)
Yum Jung-ah as Lee-Hwa (이화)
Im Kyung-wook as Jung-Ran (정란)
Park Sun-young as Jung-Ran (later replace by Im Kyung-wook)
Kim Dong-hyun as Heo-Kyoon (허균)
Park Soon-ae as Sul-Hwa (설화)
Jeon In-taek as a Grand Master (포도 대장)
Shin Choong-shik as a Buddhist monk (법열 스님)
Park Young-ji as Mae-Yun (매연)

Other
Actually, Jung-Ran casting was given to Park Sun-young, but he was pushed out of the role as he cut his hair short for filming and make Im Kyung-wook replace the cast. Because of this incident, Park was banned from appearing on MBC for six months because of the disruption to the production.

References

External links
 

MBC TV television dramas
South Korean historical television series
Television series set in the Joseon dynasty
Korean-language television shows